West Bend is a city in Kossuth and Palo Alto (originally) counties in the U.S. state of Iowa. The population was 791 at the time of the 2020 census.

History
West Bend got its start in the early 1880s, following the construction of the Burlington, Cedar Rapids and Northern Railway through that territory. It was originally called Ives after the president of the railroad, but the townspeople had it changed to West Bend from the bend in the river. West Bend (aka Ives) was the first town in Palo Alto County. A special five cent tax to build a railroad station was promised to the railroad if they would create a stop when the railroad was built. The railroad did that placing the line and the new station in West Bend.

Geography
The village straddles the county line, in the southwest part of Kossuth County and the southeast part of Palo Alto County, in northwestern Iowa. But, it was first in Palo Alto County.

West Bend is served by a lightly-used former branch line of the Rock Island Railroad now owned by the Union Pacific Railroad.

Demographics

2010 census
As of the census of 2010, there were 785 people, 360 households, and 213 families living in the city. The racial makeup of the city was 99.1% White, 0.1% Native American, and 0.8% from two or more races. Hispanic or Latino of any race were 1.4% of the population.

There were 360 households, of which 20.8% had children under the age of 18 living with them, 51.7% were married couples living together, 4.4% had a female householder with no husband present, 3.1% had a male householder with no wife present, and 40.8% were non-families. 38.1% of all households were made up of individuals, and 23.6% had someone living alone who was 65 years of age or older. The average household size was 2.07 and the average family size was 2.71.

The median age in the city was 51.6 years. 18.1% of residents were under the age of 18; 7.4% were between the ages of 18 and 24; 15.5% were from 25 to 44; 26.8% were from 45 to 64; and 32.2% were 65 years of age or older. The gender makeup of the city was 46.4% male and 53.6% female.

2000 census
At the 2000 census, there were 834 people, 352 households and 210 families living in the city. The racial makeup of the city was 99.40% White, 0.12% Native American, 0.12% Asian, and 0.36% from two or more races. Hispanic or Latino of any race were 0.48% of the population.

There were 352 households, of which 25.0% had children under the age of 18 living with them, 54.8% were married couples living together, 3.1% had a female householder with no husband present, and 40.1% were non-families. 37.2% of all households were made up of individuals, and 24.4% had someone living alone who was 65 years of age or older. The average household size was 2.21 and the average family size was 2.95.

Age distribution was 22.1% under the age of 18, 6.0% from 18 to 24, 20.5% from 25 to 44, 20.6% from 45 to 64, and 30.8% who were 65 years of age or older. The median age was 46 years. For every 100 females, there were 86.6 males. For every 100 females age 18 and over, there were 83.6 males.

The median household income was $31,711, and the median family income was $40,455. Males had a median income of $31,083 versus $20,000 for females. The per capita income for the city was $18,804. About 4.1% of families and 6.9% of the population were below the poverty line, including 7.8% of those under age 18 and 7.2% of those age 65 or over.

Attractions 

West Bend is the site of the Grotto of the Redemption, a series of nine contiguous grottos occupying a full city block, constructed of minerals, petrifications, and semiprecious gems.

Education 
West Bend is part of the West Bend–Mallard Community School District, established by the merger of the West Bend and Mallard school districts in 1995.

Notable person

Paul Dobberstein, German American priest and architect, most famous for constructing the Grotto of the Redemption; resident of West Bend

References

External links
 West Bend, Iowa website

Cities in Iowa
Cities in Kossuth County, Iowa
Cities in Palo Alto County, Iowa
1880s establishments in Iowa
Populated places established in the 1880s